Maria Brunlehner (born 1 April 2000) is a Kenyan swimmer. She competed in the women's 100 metre freestyle at the 2019 World Aquatics Championships. In 2019, she represented Kenya at the 2019 African Games held in Rabat, Morocco and she won the bronze medal in the women's 4 × 100 metre medley relay.

References

2000 births
Living people
Kenyan female swimmers
Kenyan female freestyle swimmers
Place of birth missing (living people)
African Games bronze medalists for Kenya
Swimmers at the 2019 African Games
African Games medalists in swimming
21st-century Kenyan women